Alyaksandr Stashchanyuk (born 23 February 1983) is a retired Belarusian professional footballer.

Honours
MTZ-RIPO Minsk
Belarusian Cup winner: 2004–05, 2007–08

External links

1983 births
Living people
Belarusian footballers
People from Ulan-Ude
Association football defenders
Belarusian expatriate footballers
Expatriate footballers in Poland
FC Partizan Minsk players
FC Kommunalnik Slonim players
Olimpia Elbląg players
FC Slavia Mozyr players
FC Smorgon players
FC Rudziensk players
FC Uzda players
FC Khimik Svetlogorsk players